Gaetano Faillace (September 17, 1904 – December 31, 1991) was General Douglas MacArthur's personal photographer during World War II and the American occupation of Japan after World War II.  During his time in the United States Army, he took many famous images including MacArthur wading ashore during the landing on Leyte, MacArthur with Emperor Hirohito, and the cover photo for MacArthur's book Reminiscences of General of the Army Douglas MacArthur.

Early life
Gaetano Faillace was born September 17, 1904, in New York City to Marcello and Francesca (Sciacca) Faillace.

MacArthur's photographer

Rank
When photographers were assigned to highly ranked individuals like General MacArthur, they had to be officers, as they would be present alongside many other highly ranked men.  Faillace was a sergeant before being promoted to captain when assigned to the general.  After he left MacArthur's service he went back to the rank of sergeant but his war commission had progressed during the war and when he retired he jumped ranks to major.

Landing at Leyte
On 20 October 1944, troops of Krueger's Sixth Army landed on Leyte while MacArthur watched from the light cruiser . That afternoon he arrived off the beach. The advance had not progressed far; snipers were still active and the area was under sporadic mortar fire. When his craft grounded in knee-deep water, MacArthur requested a landing craft, but the beachmaster was too busy to grant his request and MacArthur was compelled to wade ashore.  It has often been claimed that the picture is posed but William J. Dunn who was present during the landing (the only one in the picture not wearing a helmet or hat) says that rumor "is one of the most ludicrous misconceptions to come out of that war."

After landing on the beach, MacArthur gave his prepared speech, saying:

MacArthur and the Emperor
After the surrender of Japan on September 2, 1945, America occupied the home islands of Japan.  As MacArthur took residence in Tokyo, he decided on a strategy of continuity for the Japanese people.  Even though many Japanese and most of America wanted the Emperor put on trial (70% of Americans wanted him hanged) MacArthur thought that keeping the Emperor in his position would offer a symbol for the Japanese people to rally around.  If the Japanese people could rally around Hirohito and he could be controlled by the Americans, then fewer troops would be required to keep the peace in Japan.

MacArthur and Emperor Hirohito's staff set up a meeting for 10 am on September 27, 1945, to discuss how to save the Emperor's throne. When the Emperor and his entourage arrived, American officers offered to take his hat. This seemed to alarm Hirohito, as he was the God Emperor and his normal Japanese staff never took things from him. As the Emperor handed over his hat, MacArthur burst into the room, saying "You are very, very welcome, sir!" For the officers present, it was the first time they heard the general call anyone "sir".  MacArthur then moved to shake his hand, and Hirohito bowed so deeply that because of the Emperor's small stature the handshake took place above his head.  During the meeting Gaetano Faillace took three photos of the two men.  One was ruined from MacArthur closing his eyes and another from the Emperor's mouth gaping open, and the final one was approved and published in Japanese and international papers.

When the picture was published in Japanese papers, the Japanese censors were horrified at the image, which showed a towering and informal MacArthur and a small and very formal Emperor Hirohito.  To the Japanese, the God Emperor should always be the most prominent person in a picture, and to have an American standing in his company with an air of power went against all their training.  The Americans, however, who had forced the Japanese censors to publish the photo, were very pleased as the picture seemed to encapsulate the change that their occupation of Japan represented.

Retirement and death
In 1983 Faillace released a Japanese book with photographs he took from the occupation.  On December 31, 1991 he died from complications of cancer in Fayetteville, North Carolina.

At the time of his death he had family throughout America including brothers, Joseph Faillace, and Antonio Faillace in Seattle, sisters Grace Mauro of Miami, Florida and Angela Buscemi of Fort Lauderdale, Florida.  His children, including his daughters Dr. Deon Faillace, Denise Danaher, and Donna Faillace and his son, Douglas Faillace, lived in Detroit.  He also had two grandchildren.

Bibliography
Notes

References

 - Total pages: 416 

 - Total pages: 175 

 - Total pages: 210 

1904 births
1991 deaths
American photojournalists
American war photographers
United States Army personnel of World War II
American people of Italian descent
Deaths from cancer in North Carolina
Journalists from New York City
World War II photographers
United States Army officers